The 1907 Copa de Honor Cousenier was the final match to decide the winner of the Copa de Honor Cousenier, the 3rd. edition of the international competition organised by the Argentine and Uruguayan Associations together. The final was contested by Uruguayan side CURCC and Argentine team Belgrano A.C.

The match was held in the Estadio Gran Parque Central in Montevideo, on October 20, 1907. Belgrano beat CURCC 2–1, winning its first Copa Cousenier trophy.

Qualified teams 

Note

Venue

Match details 

|

References

c
c
1907 in Argentine football
1907 in Uruguayan football